Cheeks is the plural form of cheek. It may also refer to:

People
 Judy Cheeks (born 1954), American singer and actress
 Maurice Cheeks (born 1956), American National Basketball Association coach and former player
 Mr. Cheeks, (born 1971) American rapper
 Robert Cheeks (born 1980), American basketball player

Other uses
 Cheeks, a slang term for buttocks
 Cheeks, a character associated with DC Comics character Ambush Bug
 Monsieur Cheeks, character from the manga/anime series Kinnikuman
 Sandy Cheeks, a fictional squirrel in the American animated TV series SpongeBob SquarePants
 Cheeks Hill, Peak District, England
 Cheeks Nunatak, a nunatak in Palmer Land, Antarctica
 Lena Cheeks, Irkutsk Oblast, Russia

See also
 Carolyn Cheeks Kilpatrick (born 1945), American politician
 Cheek (disambiguation)